Gurgula is a Rajasthani language of Pakistan. It is lexically quite similar with Ghera, but very different grammatically.

References

Indo-Aryan languages